Chaouia may refer to:

 Chaouia (region), a historical and ethno-geographical region of Morocco
 Chaouia-Ouardigha, an administrative region of Morocco
 Shawiya people, a Berber ethnic group of Algeria
 Shawiya language, a Berber dialect spoken by Shawiyas

See also
 Chaoui music